Cava d'Aliga is a southern Italian village and marine hamlet (frazione) of Scicli, a municipality part of the Province of Ragusa, Sicily.

It has a population of 1600 circa.

Geography

References

Frazioni of the Province of Ragusa
Scicli